is a commercial building complex neighboring to the Sapporo JR Tower, located in Chūō-ku, Sapporo, Hokkaidō, Japan.

Overview 
The name "Esta" is derived from the word "Estación", which means "station" and "season" in Spanish. The building was opened as a department store, Sapporo Sogo, in 1978. Sogo closed in 2000, and the building was unused except for the first and 10th floors. 

Bic Camera, a Japanese chain of stores selling consumer electronics, opened a Sapporo branch store from the first to 6th floor in 2001, and some other companies such as Uniqlo also opened branches in the building.

Sapporo Esta is connected to Sapporo Station and Sapporo subway train station by an underground passage, and is adjacent to the Sapporo JR Tower, a bus terminal station for a number of routes, and the JR Tower hotel.

References

External links 
 Sapporo Esta official homepage 

Chūō-ku, Sapporo
Buildings and structures in Sapporo